Semtech Corporation is a supplier of analog and mixed-signal semiconductors and advanced algorithms for consumer, enterprise computing, communications and industrial end-markets. It is based in Camarillo, Ventura County, Southern California. It was founded in 1960 in Newbury Park, California. It has 32 locations in 15 countries in North America, Europe, and Asia.

Semtech is the developer of LoRa, a long-range networking initiative for the Internet of Things. As of March 2021, over 178 million devices use LoRa worldwide. LoRa has been used in satellites, tracking of animals, UAV radio control, and natural disaster prediction,

Semtech has been publicly traded since 1967. In 1995, Semtech ranked fifth on the Bloomberg 100 list of top-performing stocks of 1995 on the New York and American stock exchanges and the NASDAQ National Market.

Products
Semtech offers a variety of products, including LoRa, a long-range, low-power networking platform; receivers and transmitters; touch and proximity devices; wireless charging; and power management solutions.

Acquisitions
In December 1999, Semtech bought USAR Systems Inc., a maker of embedded devices for handheld and notebook computers, for $26.7 million in stock.

In March 2012, it bought Gennum Corporation, a supplier of high-speed analog semiconductors, for approximately CAD$500 million (US$494 million). In the same month, they acquired Cycleo SAS, a supplier of wireless semiconductor products, for $5 million in cash.

In August 2022, Semtech agreed to buy Canadian Internet of things (IoT) technology company Sierra Wireless in an all-cash transaction valued at US$1.2 billion including debt.

References

External links

Semiconductor companies of the United States
Fabless semiconductor companies
Manufacturing companies based in California
Technology companies based in Greater Los Angeles
Companies based in Ventura County, California
Camarillo, California
Electronics companies established in 1960
Technology companies established in 1960
1960 establishments in California
Companies listed on the Nasdaq
1960s initial public offerings